The Scorpion is a British National class of a small sailing dinghy. The Scorpion is a lightweight, high performance, two person, hiking racing dinghy. Its adjustable rig enables sailing in all weathers for crews of all weights, ages and experiences. The Scorpion was originally designed for launch and recovery through Cornish surf at Porthpean in St Austell Bay. Its 14ft hard chine planing hull is built to strict measurements while rig controls and cockpit layout are left to personal choice. 

Scorpions are built in wood, a combination of FRP and wood or all FRP. Wooden hulls have shown a competitive life of 20 years or more. Scorpions regularly win prizes at Boat Shows for their elegant good looks.

The ability to adjust the rig while sailing means that the Scorpion can be raced in most conditions. Its lightweight hull (81kg) gives its good performance and easy handling ashore. 

This National Class has a strong class association. The website at http://www.sailscorpion.co.uk allows members to keep in touch and contains event information, results, suppliers, technical articles, advice on tuning and race tactics and news. 

In handicap racing the Scorpion sails off a Portsmouth Yardstick of 1053.

The dinghy was designed by T.J. Dorling in 1959.

External links 
 The National Scorpion Class association (UK)
 World of Boats (EISCA) Collection

References 

Dinghies